Over the Hedge is a 2006 American computer-animated comedy film produced by DreamWorks Animation SKG and distributed by Paramount Pictures (marking Paramount's first collaboration with DreamWorks Animation).  It is loosely based on the comic strip of the same name by Michael Fry and T. Lewis. Directed by Tim Johnson and Karey Kirkpatrick (in the latter's feature directorial debut) from a screenplay by Len Blum, Lorne Cameron, David Hoselton, and Kirkpatrick, the film stars an ensemble cast featuring the voices of Bruce Willis, Garry Shandling, Steve Carell, William Shatner, Wanda Sykes, and Nick Nolte. The film's plot follows a raccoon named RJ who must reclaim food for a bear, ultimately manipulating a group of animals that had recently awakened from hibernation in order to speed up the process.

Over the Hedge was released in the United States on May 19, 2006. It received generally positive reviews from critics, and grossed $340 million on an $80 million budget.

Plot

One night, in a deserted Indiana campground, RJ the raccoon resorts to stealing a pile of food from a bear named Vincent, after a failed attempt to get food from a vending machine. However, he accidentally wakes Vincent from his hibernation, and the food is destroyed in the ensuing confrontation. An angry Vincent, instead of eating RJ, gives the raccoon an ultimatum: replace all his food in one week or be killed. RJ agrees and decides to get help to pay Vincent back.

The next morning, a family of woodland animals, consisting of the leader Verne, an ornate box turtle, hyperactive American red squirrel Hammy, striped skunk Stella, North American porcupine parents Lou and Penny, and children Spike, Bucky and Quillo, and Virginia opossum father and daughter Ozzie and Heather, awaken from their hibernation on the first day of spring. They find that much of the forest they lived in has been turned into a housing development, which is separated from the little forest remaining by a giant hedge. As the animals wonder how they will forage, RJ materialises and encourages them to traverse the hedge and steal food from the humans. Despite Verne's concerns, the animals join RJ in stealing and stockpiling human food, not knowing he intends to pay off his debt. Gladys Sharp, the neighborhood Home Owners Association president, takes notice of the animal problem and hires exterminator Dwayne LaFontant to get rid of them.

Worried, Verne tries to return the food to avoid Dwayne. RJ tries to stop him, but the food ends up destroyed due to an encounter with the excitable dog Nugent. Verne tries to convince the family to not listen to RJ, but inadvertently calls them stupid and naive, and they leave him in favor of RJ. That night, Gladys has Dwayne cover her yard in animal traps, including a contraband device called the De-Pelter Turbo which turns the entire yard into a death trap when activated.

Verne apologizes to RJ for his actions and reconciles with the other animals. On the night before the moon is full, RJ sees that Gladys has bought a massive stockpile of food and enlists the help of the animals to invade her home and steal it. Hammy successfully disables the De-Pelter Turbo while Stella steals the collar of Gladys' Persian cat Tiger, which enables entry into the house's pet door, by posing as a cat and seducing him. The animals stockpile another wagon full of food, but right as they are about to leave at sunrise, RJ sees a can of chips called Spuddies and becomes determined to get them, as Vincent specifically requested them. While trying to justify his effort to get the chips, RJ lets slip his true intentions for the food. At the same time, Gladys comes downstairs and discovers the animals, much to her horror. RJ manages to escape with the food, while the others are captured by Dwayne, who takes them away in his truck to dispose of them.

RJ gives the food to Vincent as promised, but as he sees the exterminator truck driving off, he feels remorse for his actions. Determined to save them, RJ sends the food wagon careening into the car, knocking out Dwayne and freeing the animals, though enraging Vincent. The porcupine triplets commandeer the van and drive it back home with their video-game skills, and RJ rejoins the family after Verne convinces the others to forgive him. They crash the truck into Gladys' home and return to the hedge, but are attacked from both sides of it by Vincent, Gladys, and Dwayne. RJ manages to come up with a plan. He gives Hammy an energy drink, making the squirrel hyperactive enough to move at warp speed, which he uses to go and reactivate the De-Pelter Turbo, and RJ lures Vincent into leaping over the hedge to get him. But he puts on Verne's shell, protecting him from Vincent's jaws, and Verne pulls him out with a fishing line. Vincent, Gladys, and Dwayne are caught in the De-Pelter Turbo, resulting in them being blasted with a massive dose of radiation (which somehow manages to be seen in the observable universe) and trapped in a cage left in the ensuing crater.

A dazed Vincent is shipped off to the Rocky Mountains by local animal control, while Gladys is arrested for possessing the Turbo, and Dwayne is chased by Nugent while attempting to escape. RJ joins the woodland creatures' family permanently as well as Tiger, who remains in love with Stella even after learning she is a skunk, as he cannot smell. Verne suddenly realizes they wasted a whole week without getting food for the winter, but Hammy reveals he finally found the nuts he stored for the previous winter, replenishing the animals' food supply.

Voice cast

 Bruce Willis as RJ, an intelligent, charismatic, and manipulative raccoon. Despite this, he is revealed to have a sensitive personality, developing feelings of guilt over using his new-found companions to his own ends.
 Garry Shandling as Verne, a naturally cynical and timid ornate box turtle, the leader of the foragers. He has his own ways of doing their daily tasks, but his world is turned upside-down when RJ introduces his free-spirited lifestyle into the mix. Though Verne genuinely cares for his family, he sometimes comes off as condescending. His shell falls off regularly and is laughed at. He is commonly mistaken for an amphibian despite the fact that he is a reptile.
 Steve Carell as Hammy, a hyperactive American red squirrel, whose mouth moves as fast as his feet. He is naive and childish in nature, with an extremely short attention span.
 Wanda Sykes as Stella, a short-tempered, sassy striped skunk. She later goes undercover as a black female cat to distract Tiger, and ends up falling in love with him when he reveals he has no sense of smell.
 William Shatner and Avril Lavigne as Ozzie and Heather respectively, a Virginia opossum father and daughter who see the world from different points of view; Ozzie often embarrasses Heather when he constantly feigns death to get away from danger.
 Nick Nolte as Vincent, a murderous, sadistic and gluttonous American black bear to whom RJ owes food, motivating the story. He later makes a cameo in Bee Movie.
 Thomas Haden Church as Dwayne LaFontant, an over-zealous, middle-aged pest exterminator nicknamed the "Verminator" who is hired by Gladys. He can detect the species of any animal that has recently been in the area by smell. He spoofs the Terminator.
 Allison Janney as Gladys Sharp, the president of the El Rancho Camelot Estates Home Owners Association. She is disgusted by wild animals and strict on H.O.A. rules. It's implied she is not taken seriously by the other residents of the housing development, much to her irritation.
 Eugene Levy as Lou, a North American porcupine. He is Penny's husband and the porcupine family patriarch with an overly friendly and optimistic attitude. He has a strong Minnesota accent. 
 Catherine O'Hara as Penny, the porcupine family mother, Lou's wife, and matriarch of the porcupine family; she serves as a ground between their family and the other animals.
 Omid Djalili as Tiger, a Persian cat; his full Persian name is "Prince Tigerius Mahmoud Shabazz". Initially hating the forest animals, he helps guard Gladys' house against them. However, he joins their family after he falls in love with Stella.
 Shane Baumel, Sami Kirkpatrick, and Madison Davenport as Spike, Bucky and Quillo, Lou and Penny's three identical children. They enjoy playing video games, and are the most enthusiastic about exploring the world beyond the hedge.
 Brian Stepanek as Nugent, an excitable Rottweiler whose only spoken word is "Play!". He otherwise communicates by barks.

Two minor human characters named Lunch Table Larry and BBQ Barry, appearing during the dog chase scene, were voiced by Lee Bienstock and Sean Yazbeck, two participants on The Apprentice 5 as part of a reward for winning a task.

Production
The film was originally set up at 20th Century Fox through its 20th Century Fox Animation division. The idea of the film was conceived when Don Bluth and Gary Goldman showed the comic strip to its head Chris Meledandri, who was impressed by its humour and acquired rights to the strip. He asked the screenwriting duo of Jeffrey Price and Peter S. Seaman to write the screenplay for the project for Bluth and Goldman's Fox Animation Studios; however, after the disappointing performance of its recent film Titan A.E. and its closure in 2000, this version of the film did not transpire. Fortunately, in 2001 it was picked up by DreamWorks Animation under the leadership of its CEO Jeffrey Katzenberg when Fox put the film in turnaround. Bill Murray and Harold Ramis were original considered for RJ and Verne. In July 2002, Jim Carrey was announced to co-star with Garry Shandling in the film. However, in October 2004, he dropped out, and was replaced by Bruce Willis.

Music
The soundtrack for the film was released on May 16, 2006, by Epic Records. Rupert Gregson-Williams composed the original score, while Hans Zimmer served as an executive music producer and Ben Folds contributed three original songs, along with a rewrite of his song "Rockin' the Suburbs" and a cover of The Clash's "Lost in the Supermarket."

Release

Theatrical

The film was originally going to be released in November 2005; however, in December 2004, the date was changed to May 2006. In 2006, distributor Paramount Pictures' parent company, Viacom, had purchased the rights to DreamWorks Pictures (and subsidiaries, including DreamWorks Animation).
The film was screened as a "work-in-progress" on April 29, 2006, at the Indianapolis International Film Festival, and it premiered on April 30, in Los Angeles. Nolte, Willis, Lavigne, Shandling, Sykes, O'Hara and Steve Carell attended the premiere. The film was theatrically released in the United States on May 19, 2006. In select New York and Los Angeles cinemas, it was accompanied by the short film First Flight. The film was also screened out of competition on May 21, 2006, at the Cannes Film Festival.

Home media
Over the Hedge was released on DVD by DreamWorks Animation's newly formed home entertainment division and Paramount Home Entertainment on October 17, 2006. A short film based on Over the Hedge, titled Hammy's Boomerang Adventure, was released with the DVD. The film was released on Blu-ray on February 5, 2019, by Universal Pictures Home Entertainment as a Walmart exclusive, and was subsequently given a wider release on June 4.

The DVD featured Hammy's Boomerang Adventure, a short film that was also later added in the Madly Madagascar (2013) DVD as a bonus feature. It features Steve Carell, Bruce Willis, Madison Davenport, Shane Baumel, Sami Kirkpatrick, and Garry Shandling reprising their roles from the film. The short was still included in the Over the Hedge Blu-ray. It can also be streamed on Universal parent company's, NBCUniversal, streaming service Peacock. The film is set to stream on Netflix on April 1, 2023.

Tie-ins

Video games

A video game based on the film was released on May 9, 2006. Developed by Edge of Reality, Beenox and Vicarious Visions, it was published by Activision for PlayStation 2, Microsoft Windows, Xbox, GameCube, Nintendo DS and Game Boy Advance. Shane Baumel, Sami Kirkpatrick, and Madison Davenport were the only ones to reprise their roles for the video game while everyone else was voiced by different voice actors.

Three different versions of Over the Hedge: Hammy Goes Nuts! were released by Activision in the fall of 2006: a miniature golf game for Game Boy Advance, an action adventure game for Nintendo DS, and a platform game for PlayStation Portable.

Picture books
Scholastic published a series of picture books to tie-in with the film. Over the Hedge: Meet the Neighbors and Over the Hedge: Movie Storybook were both authored by Sarah Durkee and illustrated by Michael Koelsch.

Reception

Box office
On opening weekend, the film was in second place to The Da Vinci Code, but its gross of $38,457,003 did not quite live up to DreamWorks Animation's other titles released over the past few years. The film had a per-theater average of $9,474 from 4,059 theaters. In its second weekend, the film dropped 30% to $27,063,774 for a $6,612 average from an expanded 4,093 theaters and finishing third, behind X-Men: The Last Stand and The Da Vinci Code. Since it was Memorial Day Weekend, the film grossed a total of $35,322,115 over the four-day weekend, resulting in only an 8% slide. In its third weekend, the film held well with a 24% drop to $20,647,284 and once again placing in third behind The Break-Up and X-Men: The Last Stand, for a $5,170 average from 3,993 theaters. The film closed on September 4, 2006, after 112 days of release, grossing $155,019,340 in the United States and Canada, along with $180,983,656 internationally for a worldwide total of $336,002,996, against a production budget of $80 million.

Critical response
The site's consensus states: "Even if it's not an animation classic, Over the Hedge is clever and fun, and the jokes cater to family members of all ages." On Metacritic, the film has a score of 67 out of 100 based on 31 critics, indicating "generally favorable reviews". Audiences polled by CinemaScore gave the film an average grade of "A" on an A+ to F scale.

Ken Fox of TVGuide.com called it "a sly satire of American 'enough is never enough' consumerism and blind progress at the expense of the environment. It's also very funny, and the little woodland critters that make up the cast are a kiddie-pleasing bunch". Roger Ebert of the Chicago Sun-Times give the film a three out of four stars, and called it "Not at the level of Finding Nemo or Shrek, but is a lot of fun, awfully nice to look at, and filled with energy and smiles." Peter Bradshaw of The Guardian gave the film a two out of five stars, writing "The spoilt and wasteful American consumer is satirised in this patchy animated comedy from DreamWorks."

Accolades

Possible sequel
In May 2007, DreamWorks Animation CEO, Jeffrey Katzenberg, said that despite the company exceeding Wall Street's expectations during the second consecutive quarter of 2007, the film would not get a sequel due to the box office performance of the film, saying "It was close. An almost."

In October 2010, an article was posted on the official Over the Hedge blog, explaining what would happen if a sequel was made, saying that if the sequel did not perform as well as the first one, then DreamWorks could lose money, and that a sequel probably would not happen until DreamWorks Animation was bought by a large studio, which eventually happened in 2016 when NBCUniversal bought DreamWorks Animation.

After Bruce Willis' family announced his retirement from acting in March 2022, a sequel is more then unlikely to happen anytime soon.

References

External links

 
 
 
 
 

2006 films
2006 computer-animated films
2000s American animated films
2000s children's animated films
2000s children's comedy films
American buddy comedy films
American children's animated comedy films
American computer-animated films
American heist films
Animated buddy films
Animated films about turtles
Animated films about squirrels
Animated films about cats
Animated films about bears
Animated films about friendship
Animated films based on comics
Annie Award winners
DreamWorks Animation animated films
Films about consumerism
Films about food and drink
Films about raccoons
Films about skunks
Films based on comic strips
Films directed by Karey Kirkpatrick
Films directed by Tim Johnson
Films scored by Rupert Gregson-Williams
Films produced by Bonnie Arnold
Films set in Indiana
Films with screenplays by Karey Kirkpatrick
Paramount Pictures animated films
Paramount Pictures films
2006 directorial debut films
2006 comedy films
Children's animated films
Works about suburbs
2000s English-language films